Golden Gate Canyon is in the northwestern region of Yellowstone National Park in the U.S. state of Wyoming. The northern portion of the Grand Loop Road traverses the canyon, connecting Mammoth Hot Springs with park features to the south.

A road was first built through the Golden Gate in 1884–85, replacing a steep, difficult road over Snow Pass. The construction was directed by U.S. Army Lieutenant Dan Christie Kingman. The canyon's name Golden Gate was first documented by Kingman in his reports to the Departments of the Army and Interior as what visitors to the park called the canyon and pass because of the yellow hue of the rocks in the area. The work included a wooden trestle where a cliff face precluded grading. In 1900 the  viaduct was rebuilt as a concrete structure under the supervision of Captain Hiram M. Chittenden. Chittenden's viaduct was replaced in turn in 1930–34, the outcome of a program to widen the road. The widened viaduct was itself replaced in 1977.

References

External links
 Golden Gate Viaduct, Yellowstone National Park, Teton, WY, Historic American Engineering Record documentation of the second viaduct, built 1933
 Golden Gate Viaduct, Spanning a ravine at Grand Loop Road, Kingman Pass, Yellowstone National Park, Park, WY, documentation of historic and present viaducts at HAER

Canyons and gorges of Wyoming
Canyons and gorges of Teton County, Wyoming
Landforms of Yellowstone National Park
Historic American Engineering Record in Wyoming